Prince (Knyaz or Bey) Stefan Bogoridi (born Стойко Цонков Стойков, Stoyko Tsonkov Stoykov; ; ; ; ; 1775 or 1780–August 1, 1859) was a high-ranking Ottoman statesman of Bulgarian origin, grandson of Sophronius of Vratsa and father of Alexander Bogoridi and Nicolae Vogoride. Stefan and his brother Athanase were named Bogoridi after Boris I, the first Christian ruler of Bulgaria (who was also known under the name Bogoris). Their parents were Ioan Vogoridi and Ana N.

Biography
Born in Kotel, Bogoridi studied in the Greek-language Princely Academy in Bucharest, Wallachia, where he changed his Bulgarian name Stoyko for the Greek Ștefan. After finishing his studies, Bogoridi joined the Ottoman fleet as Dragoman and, under the command of Seid Mustafa Pasha (future Sultan Mustafa IV), took part in the Second Battle of Abukir against Napoleon Bonaparte in Egypt, making a miraculous escape after the defeat of the Ottoman forces.

In 1812, Stefan Bogoridi went to Moldavia with Prince Scarlat Callimachi, who appointed him governor of Galați (1812-1819). In 1821, during the local uprising of Tudor Vladimirescu and the invasion of Filiki Eteria as part of the Greek War of Independence, Bogoridi was nominal Caimacam of Wallachia; the following year, after the sweeping Ottoman offensive against Alexander Ypsilantis, he held the actual position of Caimacam in Moldavia 1822, and then returned as Dragoman of the Ottoman fleet. Between 1825 and 1828, he was exiled in Anatolia.

After the Russo-Turkish War of 1828-1829 and the Treaty of Adrianople, he was an advisor of Mahmud II, who gave him the title of prince (bey, ηγεμόνας) and appointed him governor of the island of Samos. He visited Samos only once in 1839 and ruled the island from Istanbul. Bogoridi, who renamed the capital of the island Stefanopolis after himself, was hated by the local Greek population due to his arbitrary rule. The Samians revolted against him in 1849 and had the Sultan dismiss him in 1850.

Under Abdülmecid I, Bogoridi was a member of the Tanzimat Council and an imperial counsellor. He obtained permission from Abdülmecid for building a Bulgarian Orthodox church in Istanbul, and donated his house in Fener (1849). On that spot, the famous Bulgarian Iron church was later erected, and named Saint Stephen in memory of him. He died in Istanbul.

References

Sources
 

18th-century births
1859 deaths
Bulgarian nobility
19th-century Bulgarian people
Dragomans
Political people from the Ottoman Empire
Ottoman people of the Greek War of Independence
Moldavian people of the Greek War of Independence
Rulers of Moldavia
Saint Sava National College alumni
People from Kotel, Bulgaria
Princes of Samos
19th-century rulers in Europe